Kazarki was a Khazar settlement. It was located west of the Volga River and north of Sarkel (probably in the present-day Penza Oblast), from roughly the 7th through the 10th centuries CE. The area around it was known in early Russian sources as Volost' Kazarskaya, or "Khazar region."

References

Resources
Kevin Alan Brook. The Jews of Khazaria, 3rd ed., Lanham, MD: Rowman and Littlefield, 2018.
Peter B. Golden. Khazar Studies: An Historico-Philological Inquiry into the Origins of the Khazars, Vol. 1. Budapest: Akadémiai Kiadó, 1980.

Khazar towns